Richard Gordon Swan (born 1933) is an American mathematician who is known for the Serre–Swan theorem relating the geometric notion of vector bundles to the algebraic concept of projective modules, and for the Swan representation, an l-adic projective representation of a Galois group. His work has mainly been in the area of algebraic K-theory.

Education and career
As an undergraduate at Princeton University, Swan was one of five winners in the William Lowell Putnam Mathematical Competition in 1952. He earned his Ph.D. in 1957 from Princeton University under the supervision of John Coleman Moore.

In 1969 he proved in full generality what is now known as the Stallings-Swan theorem. He is the Louis Block Professor Emeritus of Mathematics at the University of Chicago.

His doctoral students at Chicago include Charles Weibel, also known for his work in K-theory.

Awards and honors
In 1970 Swan was awarded the American Mathematical Society's Cole Prize in Algebra.

Books

References

External links
Swan's homepage at Chicago.

Year of birth missing (living people)
Living people
20th-century American mathematicians
21st-century American mathematicians
Princeton University alumni
University of Chicago faculty
Members of the United States National Academy of Sciences
Putnam Fellows